Joop Kasteel, also known as "de zwarte parel" ("the black pearl", born 27 August 1964), is a Dutch former mixed martial artist. He made his mixed martial arts debut on 15 June 1996. He is a veteran of the RINGS promotion and as he has fought the majority of his fights for them.

Kasteel's trainers were Chris Dolman, Hans Nijman and Michel van Halderen he also stated he trained with "Dirty" Bob Schrijber. As a former bodybuilder he went into the MMA world & became one of the most popular Dutch fighters noted for his power and physique, normally weighing in at around 265 lbs.

Mixed martial arts record

|-
| Win
| align=center| 19-13
| Dan Severn
| KO (knee & punches)
| Rings Holland: Men of Honor
| 
| align=center| 1
| align=center| 0:46
| Netherlands
| 
|-
| Loss
| align=center| 18-13
| Cheick Kongo
| KO (punch)
| Rings Holland: World's Greatest
| 
| align=center| 1
| 
| Netherlands
| 
|-
| Win
| align=center| 18-12
| Peter Verschuren
| DQ
| It's Showtime 2003 Amsterdam
| 
| align=center| 2
| align=center| 5:00
| Netherlands
| 
|-
| Loss
| align=center| 17-12
| Jerrel Venetiaan
| KO (punches)
| 2H2H 6: Simply the Best 6
| 
| align=center| 1
| align=center| 6:28
| Netherlands
| 
|-
| Win
| align=center| 17-11
| Dave Vader
| Submission (scarf hold)
| Rings Holland: One Moment In Time
| 
| align=center| 1
| 
| Netherlands
| 
|-
| Win
| align=center| 16-11
| Barrington Renford Patterson
| Submission (neck crank)
| It's Showtime – As Usual / Battle Time
| 
| align=center| 1
| 
| Netherlands
| 
|-
| Loss
| align=center| 15-11
| Paul Cahoon
| Submission (exhausation)
| 2H2H 4: Simply the Best 4
| 
| 
| 
| Netherlands
| 
|-
| Win
| align=center| 15-10
| Fatih Kocamis
| Submission (armlock)
| Rings Holland: Some Like It Hard
| 
| align=center| 1
| align=center| 1:57
| Netherlands
| 
|-
| Win
| align=center| 14-10
| Hubert Numrich
| Submission (armlock)
| BOA 3: Battle of Arnhem 3
| 
| align=center| 1
| 
| Netherlands
| 
|-
| Loss
| align=center| 13-10
| Paul Cahoon
| KO (punch)
| Rings Holland: No Guts, No Glory
| 
| align=center| 2
| 
| Netherlands
| 
|-
| Win
| align=center| 13-9
| Roman Zentsov
| Submission (shoulder lock)
| MillenniumSports: Veni Vidi Vici
| 
| 
| 
| Netherlands
| 
|-
| Win
| align=center| 12-9
| Yuriy Kochkine
| Decision (unanimous)
| Rings Holland: Heroes Live Forever
| 
| align=center| 2
| align=center| 5:00
| Netherlands
| 
|-
| Loss
| align=center| 11-9
| Bobby Hoffman
| KO (punches)
| Rings: King of Kings 2000 Block B
| 
| align=center| 1
| align=center| 0:43
| Osaka, Japan
| 
|-
| Win
| align=center| 11-8
| Lee Hasdell
| TKO (shoulder injury)
| Rings Holland: Di Capo Di Tutti Capi
| 
| align=center| 1
| align=center| 1:18
| Netherlands
| 
|-
| Loss
| align=center| 10-8
| Gilbert Yvel
| KO (palm strikes)
| Rings Holland: There Can Only Be One Champion
| 
| align=center| 1
| align=center| 4:16
| Netherlands
| 
|-
| Loss
| align=center| 10-7
| Tariel Bitsadze
| TKO
| Rings: Rings Georgia
| 
| align=center| 1
| align=center| 4:11
| Georgia, United States
| 
|-
| Loss
| align=center| 10-6
| Kiyoshi Tamura
| Submission (armbar)
| Rings: Rise 5th
| 
| align=center| 2
| align=center| 2:17
|  Japan
| 
|-
| Win
| align=center| 10-5
| Tariel Bitsadze
| Submission (keylock)
| Rings: Rise 4th
| 
| align=center| 1
| align=center| 6:01
|  Japan
| 
|-
| Loss
| align=center| 9-5
| Mikhail Ilyukhin
| Submission (achilles lock)
| Rings: Rise 3rd
| 
| align=center| 1
| align=center| 9:40
|  Japan
| 
|-
| Loss
| align=center| 9-4
| Yoshihisa Yamamoto
| TKO (palm strikes)
| Rings: Rise 2nd
| 
| align=center| 1
| align=center| 7:32
|  Japan
| 
|-
| Win
| align=center| 9-3
| Henk Kuipers
| KO (palm strikes)
| Rings Holland: Judgement Day
| 
| align=center| 1
| 
| Netherlands
| 
|-
| Win
| align=center| 8-3
| Masayuki Naruse
| TKO
| Rings: World Mega Battle Tournament
| 
| align=center| 1
| align=center| 8:33
|  Japan
| 
|-
| Win
| align=center| 7-3
| Herman van Tol
| KO (kick to the body)
| Rings Holland: Who's the Boss
| 
| 
| 
| Netherlands
| 
|-
| Loss
| align=center| 6-3
| Zaza Tkeshelashvili
| Submission
| Rings: Third Fighting Integration
| 
| align=center| 1
| align=center| 5:54
| Tokyo, Japan
| 
|-
| Win
| align=center| 6-2
| Ameran Bitsadze
| Submission (arm triangle choke)
| Rings Holland: The King of Rings
| 
| align=center| 1
| align=center| 2:15
| Netherlands
| 
|-
| Loss
| align=center| 5-2
| Kiyoshi Tamura
| KO
| Rings: Battle Dimensions Tournament 1997 Final
| 
| 
| 
| 
| 
|-
| Win
| align=center| 5-1
| Lee Hasdell
| Submission (headlock)
| Rings: Mega Battle Tournament 1997 Semifinal 1
| 
| align=center| 1
| align=center| 8:55
|  Japan
| 
|-
| Loss
| align=center| 4-1
| Pete Williams
| TKO (knee injury)
| Rings: Extension Fighting 7
| 
| align=center| 1
| align=center| 8:25
|  Japan
| 
|-
| Win
| align=center| 4-0
| Pedro Palm
| KO (palm strikes)
| Rings Holland: Utrecht at War
| 
| align=center| 1
| 
| Netherlands
| 
|-
| Win
| align=center| 3-0
| Mitsuya Nagai
| TKO (lost points)
| Rings: Extension Fighting 2
| 
| align=center| 1
| align=center| 6:27
|  Japan
| 
|-
| Win
| align=center| 2-0
| Mitsuya Nagai
| KO (punches)
| Rings Holland: The Final Challenge
| 
| align=center| 1
| align=center| 5:12
| Netherlands
| 
|-
| Win
| align=center| 1-0
| Rusky Rodgers
| N/A
| Fight Gala: Mix Fight Night
| 
| 
| 
| Netherlands
|

References

External links
 
 
 "RINGS Holland 'The worlds (sic) greatest'" - SFUK
 "JOOP INTERVIEW CASTLE (2)" - Mix Fight
 "JOOP INTERVIEW CASTLE (4)" - Mix Fight
 "RINGS HOLLAND 'The worlds (sic) greatest'" - Ashihara Karate
 "Cahoon leads Euro fight" - Echo
 "Judoka Harvey shows his muscles in Putten" - de Stentor
 "FIGHTING NETWORK RINGS" - Quebrada

1964 births
Living people
Dutch male mixed martial artists
Heavyweight mixed martial artists
Dutch bodybuilders
Sportspeople from Amersfoort